Nattawut Saengsri (born  August 15, 1997),  is a Thai professional footballer who plays as a midfielder.

External links
 

1997 births
Living people
Nattawut Saengsri
Nattawut Saengsri
Association football midfielders
Nattawut Saengsri
Nattawut Saengsri
Nattawut Saengsri
Nattawut Saengsri